Cherkasy River Station is a river station at Cherkasy River Port on the Dnieper River within the city of Cherkasy, Ukraine.

Gallery

See also

Cherkasy River Port
Kyiv River Station

References

Cherkasy
Transport in Ukraine by city